Gol-e Sadbarg, is the debut album of Shahram Nazeri released in 1984, containing eight tracks. The album consisted exclusively of the lesser-known poems of Rumi and was released on the 800th anniversary of the birth of Rumi. The album became immensely successful and became the biggest selling album of both Persian music and Sufi music. Released amidst the Iran–Iraq War further generated its popularity due to the difficult times. Nazeri was accompanied with Setar players Jalal Zolfonun, Reza Ghassemi and Daf player Bijan Kamkar.

Impact 
The popularity of the album made Setar classes popular around Iran.

Track listing

References

1984 albums
Persian-language albums